George R. Snowden (February 12, 1841 – April 21, 1932) was a Pennsylvania lawyer and military officer who served as commander of the organization now known as the 28th Infantry Division.

Early life
George Randolph Snowden was born in Franklin, Pennsylvania, on February 12, 1841.  He was educated locally, studied law, and was admitted to the bar in 1862.

Civil War
In August 1862 Snowden enlisted in the unit which was later designated Company I, 142nd Pennsylvania Infantry. He was commissioned as a first lieutenant in September, became the company commander in 1863, and took part in the battles of Antietam, Fredericksburg, Chancellorsville and Gettysburg.  He was a captain when he was discharged in April 1864.

Post-Civil War
Snowden practiced law in Franklin until relocating to Philadelphia in 1874, and was active in local businesses including the Franklin Gas Company.  He also continued his military service as a member of the Pennsylvania National Guard.

He served as commander of the 3rd Infantry Regiment with the rank of colonel, and took part in the military response in Pittsburgh during the Great Railroad Strike of 1877. In 1878 he was promoted to Brigadier General as commander of the 1st Brigade.

Besides practicing law, Snowden also served in appointive offices, including Assistant Customs Appraiser for the Port of Philadelphia and Chief Clerk of Philadelphia's United States Mint.  When the federal government began to enact civil service reform, Snowden served on the board of examiners for the Philadelphia Customs office.
In 1880 he was an unsuccessful Democratic Party candidate for Congress, and he later served on Philadelphia's Select Council.  (At the time, the city's legislative functions were carried out by two bodies, the Select Council and the Common Council.)

Later career
In 1890 he was promoted to major general as commander of the Pennsylvania National Guard Division, succeeding John F. Hartranft.  At the time, the division consisted of three brigades and various separate units.

Snowden commanded the National Guard during the Homestead Strike in July, 1892.  He sided with the Carnegie Steel owners over the striking union workers, saying "Pennsylvanians can hardly appreciate the actual communism of these people.  They believe the works are theirs quite as much as Carnegie's."

The militia's efforts to curtail the activities of striking workers enabled the owners to reopen with non-union labor.

Retirement
Snowden retired from the military in 1900, and was succeeded as division commander by Charles Miller.  In his later years Snowden was one of Philadelphia's Real Estate Assessors.
Snowden was active in the Grand Army of the Republic and Military Order of the Loyal Legion of the United States.  He took part in numerous Union Army reunions, as well as the dedication of several monuments and memorials.

He was also active in fraternal and civic organizations, including the Masons and the Sons of the American Revolution.

Snowden wrote on military subjects and other topics, and was a popular public speaker.  Some of his speeches were republished as articles or pamphlets.
In 1971 portions of his Civil War diary were published as Home to Franklin! Excerpts from the Civil War Diary of George Randolph Snowden.

Snowden never married, and had no children.

Death and burial
Snowden died in Philadelphia on April 21, 1932.  He was buried in Franklin Cemetery in the city of Franklin, Section D, Lot 19.  In 1869 Snowden had been an original incorporator of the cemetery.

References

External links
 

1841 births
1932 deaths
People from Franklin, Pennsylvania
Pennsylvania lawyers
Lawyers from Philadelphia
Pennsylvania Democrats
Philadelphia City Council members
United States Department of the Treasury officials
Union Army officers
American militia generals
National Guard (United States) officers
Burials in Pennsylvania
American lawyers admitted to the practice of law by reading law
Pennsylvania National Guard personnel